Southend railway station served the area of Mumbles, in the historical county of Glamorgan, Wales, from 1807 to 1960 on the Swansea and Mumbles Railway.

History
The station was opened on 25 March 1807 by the Oystermouth Railway. It was a request stop. Like the rest of the stations on the line, the first services were horse-drawn. It closed in 1827 but it reopened on 6 May 1893. It was known as Mumbles (Southend) but it was later changed to Southend when the line was extended to Mumbles Pier on 10 May 1898. It was also resited around this time. The station closed along with the line on 6 January 1960.

References

Disused railway stations in Swansea
Railway stations in Great Britain opened in 1893
Railway stations in Great Britain closed in 1960
1960 disestablishments in Wales